Mohsen Kouhkan Rizi (born 1957) is an Iranian economist and conservative politician who represents Lenjan district in the Parliament of Iran since 2016. He previously held the position from 1992 to 1996 and 2004 until 2008.

References

1957 births
Living people
Members of the 4th Islamic Consultative Assembly
Members of the 7th Islamic Consultative Assembly
Members of the 10th Islamic Consultative Assembly
Association of Muslim Journalists politicians
Rastakhiz Party politicians
Secretaries-General of political parties in Iran